Gerald Albright is an American jazz saxophonist. He earned Grammys for 24/7 in 2012 and Slam Dunk in 2014 and has been nominated for New Beginnings in 2008 and for Sax for Stax in 2009.

Biography 
Albright began piano lessons at an early age, although he professed no interest in the instrument. His love of music picked up when he was given a saxophone that belonged to his piano teacher. It further reinforced when he attended Locke High School. After high school, he attended the University of Redlands where he was initiated into the Iota Chi Chapter of Alpha Phi Alpha and received a degree in business management with a minor concentration on music. He switched to bass guitar after he saw Louis Johnson in concert.

After college, Albright worked as a studio musician in the 1980s for Anita Baker, Ray Parker Jr., Olivia Newton-John, and The Temptations. He joined Patrice Rushen, who was forming a band, in which he played saxophone. When the bassist left in the middle of a tour, Albright replaced him and finished the tour playing bass guitar. Around the same time, he began to tour Europe with drummer Alphonse Mouzon. He has also toured with Anita Baker, Phil Collins, Johnny Hallyday, Whitney Houston, Quincy Jones, Jeff Lorber, and Teena Marie In addition to appearances at clubs and jazz festivals, he has been part of Jazz Explosion tours on which he played with Will Downing, Jonathan Butler, Chaka Khan, Hugh Masekela, and Rachelle Ferrell.

Albright has appeared in the television programs A Different World, Melrose Place and jazz segments for Black Entertainment Television, as well as piloting a show in Las Vegas with Meshach Taylor of Designing Women. He was one of ten saxophonists to perform at the inauguration of President Bill Clinton.

His saxophone work appears in the PlayStation video game Castlevania: Symphony of the Night during the theme song "I Am the Wind", which includes keyboardist Jeff Lorber.

Albright himself describes his playing style as being influenced to a large extend by the music which he heard when being a teenager: A mixture of gospel, Motown, Philly International Sound played by the likes of James Cleveland, The Hawkins Singers, James Brown with his band and particularly Maceo Parker.

In September 2021 Gerald Albright received the Presidential Lifetime Achievement Award from President Joseph R. Biden.

Equipment 
Albright plays a signature series model of saxophone made by Cannonball Musical Instruments.  Of the two necks that are furnished with the Cannonball saxophones, he usually uses the "Fat Neck" with the octave vent tube on the bottom of the neck, a design similar to some vintage Conn 6M models. Albright also plays bass guitar.

Discography

Studio albums

Live albums

EP's

As sideman/guest

Grammy Awards 

The Grammy Awards are awarded annually by the National Academy of Recording Arts and Sciences. Albright has received a sum of nine Grammy nominations.

References

External links 
Gerald Albright at NPR Music
Gerald Albright Signature Series Saxophones

African-American woodwind musicians
African-American guitarists
American jazz bass guitarists
American jazz keyboardists
American jazz saxophonists
American male saxophonists
Living people
Smooth jazz saxophonists
University of Redlands alumni
GRP Records artists
African-American jazz musicians
American male bass guitarists
American male guitarists
20th-century American guitarists
21st-century American saxophonists
20th-century American male musicians
21st-century American male musicians
American male jazz musicians
20th-century African-American musicians
21st-century African-American musicians
Year of birth missing (living people)
The Phil Collins Big Band members